University Baptist Church may refer to:

 University Baptist Church (Austin, Texas), in Austin, Texas, listed on the U.S. National Register of Historic Places
 University Baptist Church, in Baltimore, MD, close to Johns Hopkins University
 University Baptist Church (Jacksonville, Florida), affiliated with University Christian School